Aspidura copei, commonly known as Cope's rough-sided snake or කලු මැඩිල්ලා  (kalu medilla) in Sinhalese, is a species of snake in the family Colubridae. The species is endemic to Sri Lanka.

Etymology
The specific name, copei, is in honor of American herpetologist and paleontologist Edward Drinker Cope.

Geographic range
A. copei is a found in the mountains of central Sri Lanka. Localities recorded are Dimbulla, Dickoya, Hopewell estate of Balangoda, Avissawella, and Pundaluoya.

Description
The head of A. copei is indistinct from the neck, and the body is cylindrical. The dorsum is brown, with a brownish-olive mid-dorsal band, 2-3 scales wide, flanked on each side by a series of 23-26 dark blotches. The flanks have dark markings occupying 2-4 scales that reach the ventrals. The forehead is olive-brown, and the lips are light yellow, edged with black. A narrow dark band descends diagonally from the temporals, past the angle of mouth, to the edge of the ventrals. The venter is mottled green, with a series of solid blotches along the ventral mid-line.

Adults may attain a total length (including tail) of 63.5 cm (2 feet, 1 inch).

Behaviour
A. copei is a burrowing snake.

Scalation
In A. copei the dorsal scales are in 17 rows at midbody. Preoculars are absent. There are 2 postoculars in contact with the parietal. The ventrals number 123-137; and the subcaudals number 15-35.

Reproduction
Details of the reproduction of A. copei are generally unknown. Only one female with 21 "remarkably round" eggs was found.

References

External links
https://www.iucnredlist.org/species/176348/7223228
http://www.itis.gov/servlet/SingleRpt/SingleRpt?search_topic=TSN&search_value=700771
http://www.wildreach.com/reptile/Serpentes/Aspidura%20copei.php

Further reading
Boulenger GA (1893). Catalogue of the Snakes in the British Museum (Natural History). Volume I., Containing the Families ... Colubridæ Aglyphæ ... London: Trustees of the British Museum (Natural History). (Taylor and Francis, printers). xiii + 448 pp. + Plates I-XXVIII. (Aspidura copii, pp. 311–312).
Günther ACLG (1864). The Reptiles of British India. London: The Ray Society. (Taylor and Francis, printers). xxvii + 452 pp. + Plates I-XXVI. (Aspidura copii, new species, p. 203 + Plate XVIII, figure E).
Smith MA (1943). The Fauna of British India, Ceylon and Burma, Including the Whole of the Indo-Chinese Sub-region. Reptilia and Amphibia, Vol. III.—Serpentes. London: Secretary of State for India. (Taylor and Francis, printers). xii + 583 pp. (Aspidura copii, pp. 336–337).
Wall F (1921). Ophidia Taprobanica or the Snakes of Ceylon. Colombo, Ceylon [Sri Lanka]: Colombo Museum. (H.R. Cottle, Government Printer). xxii + 581 pp. (Aspidura copei, pp. 207–208).

Aspidura
Reptiles described in 1864
Reptiles of Sri Lanka
Taxa named by Albert Günther